Leipziger Jazztage is a jazz festival in Germany.

External links
Website

Jazz festivals in Germany